Manza Bay is a bay in Tanzania.

History
In the East African campaign of World War I, the Royal Navy protected cruiser  attacked and damaged a German auxiliary ship off Manza Bay on 14 April 1915. It was a  British cargo steamship, Rubens, which the German authorities had seized in Hamburg in 1914. The German Navy had disguised Rubens as the Danish cargo ship Kronborg and sent her to replenish the cruiser  in the Indian Ocean.

The German crew succeeded in beaching their ship in the bay, salvaged all the arms and ammunition from Rubens cargo, and abandoned her. The arms and ammunition helped German land forces in East Africa to continue their campaign against British and Empire forces.

Rubens cargo also included coal to bunker Königsberg. In 1956 an Italian salvage company repaired Rubens hull, refloated her, towed her to Dar es Salaam with two tugboats and sold her coal to the East African Railways and Harbours Corporation.

In World War II the Royal Navy laid indicator loops off Manza Bay to defend the coast against German and Japanese submarines.

See also
Historic Swahili Settlements

References

External links
 Royal Navy Harbour Defences – Manza Bay, Tanzania

Swahili people
Swahili city-states
Swahili culture
Bays of Tanzania
Bays of the Indian Ocean
Military history of Tanzania